Agamdeep Darshi is an English-Canadian actress, now based in Los Angeles.

Early life
Born as Agamdeep Darshi in Birmingham, the United Kingdom, to parents of South Asian Punjabi (Indian) descent. At a very young age she and her family moved to Canada. She grew up in Montreal, Ottawa, Calgary, San Jose and Vancouver. At the age of 14 she left home and moved to Calgary, to pursue a career of acting. Darshi studied Theatre and Fine Arts at the University of Calgary and earned a degree in photography.

Career
Darshi has made appearances in over twenty-five television productions along with appearing in over a dozen films. She is best known for her roles in Tru Calling, Dead Zone, The L-Word, and as Laura in the horror film Final Destination 3. She appeared in a recurring role on the Canadian teen-drama television series renegadepress.com. From 2009 to 2011, Darshi appeared in the television series Sanctuary. She was part of the main cast in seasons two and three and had a recurring role in season four.

Darshi is also a producer, director, writer, screenwriter, playwright, artist, and graphic designer. At the 2013 Leo Awards, she won Best Supporting Performance by a Female in a Motion Picture for her role in the feature Crimes of Mike Recket. Along with fellow South Asian actress Patricia Isaac, she co-founded the Vancouver International South Asian Film Festival (VISAFF).
She has also appeared as Ruby Shivani in season 2 of TV serial You Me Her.

In January 2021, she began principal photography on her directorial debut film, titled Donkeyhead, in Regina, Saskatchewan. The film, in which Darshi also played the lead character, premiered at the 2021 Mosaic International South Asian Film Festival.

Personal life
She is married to Juan Riedinger and they have twin sons.

Filmography

References

External links

 
 

Canadian film actresses
Canadian television actresses
English film actresses
English emigrants to Canada
English television actresses
Canadian people of Indian descent
Living people
People from Birmingham, West Midlands
Actresses from Vancouver
1987 births